Ministry of Armaments or Ministry of Munitions may refer to:
Reich Ministry of Armaments and War Production  (Nazi Germany)
Minister of Munitions (Britain)
 Department of Munitions and Supply (Canada)
Ministry of Munitions (Japan)
Minister of Armaments (France)
 Ministry of Armaments of the USSR

See also
Department of Munitions, Australian WWII department headed by the Minister for Munitions